The Brazi Power Station is a large thermal power plant located in Brazi, having 9 generation groups, 5 of 50 MW each, 2 of 150 MW and 2 of 200 MW resulting a total electricity generation capacity of 950 MW.

Between 2004 and 2022 it was operated by S.C. Dalkia Termo Prahova S.R.L. later renamed to S.C. Veolia Energie Prahova S.R.L. Since 2022, it is operated by Termoficare Prahova SA.

See also

 List of power stations in Romania

References

External links
Description 

Coal-fired power stations in Romania